Full Alert may refer to:

 Full Alert (film), 1997 Hong Kong film
 An episode of Stargate SG-1 (season 8)